Yaroslavl State Medical University (YSMU) is a university in Yaroslavl, a city in European part of Russia. It was founded in 1944. YSMU is a regional center of medical education and bio-medical research.

Departments 
There are educational faculties and divisions in YSMU, these are: 
General Medicine Faculty, 
Pediatric Faculty, 
Pharmacy Faculty, 
Faculty of Post-Graduate education and professional retraining of specialists of the healthcare, 
Division of Advanced Education, 
Pre-Education (preparatory)

Foreign students 
Education of foreign students both on budget (governmental) and contract basis was started by YSMU in 1992. YSMU has social facilities and structure.

Medical training and education are conducted by 55 departments. The academic staff of YSMU consists of more than 550 persons. Among them, more than 400 have the M.D. and Ph.D. titles (including 310 candidates of sciences, assistant and associated professors and 70 doctors of sciences and full professors).

External links
 Yaroslavl State Medical University. Official site

Universities in Russia
Yaroslavl
Buildings and structures in Yaroslavl Oblast
Medical schools in Russia